Apriona cylindrica is a species of beetle in the family Cerambycidae. It was described by Thomson in 1857. It is known from Java.

References

Batocerini
Beetles described in 1857